Patrick Desmond Whitty (25 July 1908 – March 1994) was an Irish Gaelic footballer who played at club level with John Mitchels and at inter-county level with the Kerry senior football team. He played both in defence and as a forward.

Playing career

Whitty first came to Gaelic football prominence as a member of the John Mitchels club that won County Championship titles in 1929 and 1937. He was just 18-years-old when he was drafted onto the Kerry senior football team and was a member of the team that won the All-Ireland Championship in 1926, however, he didn't receive a winners' medal. Whitty was also a member of the Kerry team that won the title in 1930 but did not appear in the All-Ireland final win over Monaghan. He claimed back-to-back All-Ireland medals on the field of play in 1931 and 1932. Whitty's other honours with Kerry include being involved in eight Munster Championship-winning teams and two National Football League medals on the field of play. He also won a Railway Cup medal with Munster.

Personal life and death

Born in Tralee, County Kerry, Whitty emigrated to London in 1939. He spent most of his working life there in the pub trade. Whitty was also a mainstay of the Kerry Association in London.

Whitty died in March 1994.

Honours

John Mitchels
Kerry Senior Football Championship: 1929, 1937

Kerry
All-Ireland Senior Football Championship: 1926, 1930, 1931, 1932, 1937
Munster Senior Football Championship: 1926, 1927, 1930, 1931, 1932, 1933, 1934, 1936
National Football League: 1927–28, 1930–31, 1931–32

Munster
Railway Cup: 1931

References

1908 births
1994 deaths
John Mitchels (Kerry) Gaelic footballers
Kerry inter-county Gaelic footballers
Munster inter-provincial Gaelic footballers